Public Finance comprises a bimonthly magazine, a UK news website and an international news website covering public policy and public sector finance.

History and profile
Public Finance was first published  in 1896 under the name Financial Circular. In 1935 the publication was renamed to Local Government Finance, and in 1974 it became Public Finance and Accountancy. Philip Windsor was appointed as the first professional journalist editor in 1978.

The magazine's title was shortened to Public Finance in the 1980s. The current editor is Jon Watkins.
Publicfinance.co.uk was launched in the late 1990s, and Publicfinanceinternational.org was launched in March 2012.

It is published by Redactive Media Group  on behalf of the Chartered Institute of Public Finance & Accountancy, the only professional accountancy body in both the UK and globally to specialise in public services.

From July 2022 to June 2021 Public Finance magazine had a circulation of 13,277 copies according to the Audit Bureau of Circulation.

References

External links
 publicfinance.co.uk
 publicfinanceinternational.org

Business magazines published in the United Kingdom
Monthly magazines published in the United Kingdom
Magazines established in 1896